The Social Care Institute for Excellence (SCIE; pronounced 'sky') is a UK charity and improvement agency. SCIE shares knowledge about what works in practice across social care, social work and beyond, covering adults’, families’ and children's care and support services.

SCIE has a role identifying and disseminating the knowledge base for good practice in all aspects of social care in the United Kingdom. It produces guides in different formats, including specialist tool kits and more general learning materials, covering management and policy issues as well as day to day services. This includes training, consultancy, webinars, research and product development to support improvement. These products and services are co-produced with people who use services and carers, and through collaboration with care providers, commissioners, policymakers and researchers.

SCIE's work priorities include driving improvements in social care locally, influencing better policy and practice nationally and supporting better safeguarding everywhere. 

Its vision is a society where care and support maximises people's choices, removes social inequality, and enables people to live fulfilling, safe and healthy lives.

Its mission is research, evidence, share and support the implementation of best practice. We use this evidence and experience to shape policy and outcomes, and to raise awareness of the importance of social care and social work for creating a fair and equal society. Everything we do is informed by people with experience of care and support.

Its values are being progressive, inclusive, credible, transparent and committed.

History
The Social Care Institute for Excellence (SCIE) was established in 2001. SCIE improves the lives of people of all ages by co-producing, sharing, and supporting the use of the best available knowledge and evidence about what works in practice.

The funding received from the government fell to £4.4million in 2013−14 (with £1m of this intended for specific projects), having previously been more than £20m in 2009−10 (of which £14m was allocated to specific projects).

SCIE ran the NICE Collaborating Centre for Social Care (NCCSC) from 2013 to 2018. Quick Guides from the project continued to be produced until 2022. 

SCIE was commissioned by the Department of Health (now called the Department of Health and Social Care) to provide support over the Care Act 2014; looking at issues such as assessment and eligibility, safeguarding adults and advocacy.

During the Covid-19 pandemic in 2020, the Department of Health and Social Care commissioned SCIE to produce guidance and practical examples for commissioners to help them support providers beyond the COVID-19 pandemic.

In November 2021, SCIE published A place we can call home: A vision and a roadmap for providing more options for housing with care and support for older people. The report, report for commissioners and managers in health and social care develops a vision and roadmap for providing more options for housing with care and support.

Since 2016, SCIE has run Co-production Week. Co-production is about working in equal partnership with people using services, carers, families and citizens. Co-production offers the chance to transform social care and health provision to a model that offers people real choice and control.

Current practice

SCIE continue to produce a number of free resources for social care and social work staff at all levels.

In recent years they have evolved from a largely government-funded body to a more commercial organisation, increasing their income from training and consultancy work and becoming less reliant on the Department of Health and Social Care for funding.

Much of their current work focuses on transformation of care systems and implementing person-centred practice such as strengths-based approaches. They also have a large body of work on integration of health and social care, having provided national support as part of their work with the Better Care Fund.

SCIE continue to be well known for their resources on safeguarding adults and children, on the Mental Capacity Act 2005 and on Deprivation of Liberty Safeguards.

One of their core aims is to improve participation and Co-production (public services) with people who use services and carers to develop and deliver better social care and health provision. Much of their work encompasses this principle.

SCIE continues to maintain Social Care Online (originally launched in 2005) - the UK's biggest database of social care and social work information including wide-scale research, reports, government and policy documents, journal articles, and websites.

SCIE sends out an occasional (About once or twice a month) email bulletin, called SCIELine

See also
Department of Health and Social Care
National Institute for Health and Clinical Excellence
Paul Burstow (Chair of the Social Care Institute for Excellence)

References

External links
 

Social work organizations
Social care in the United Kingdom
Social welfare charities based in the United Kingdom